The Arizona Adrenaline were a professional indoor American football team based in Prescott Valley, Arizona. They were members of the Mountain West division of the Intense Conference of the Indoor Football League (IFL). The Adrenaline were founded in 2008 as an expansion member of the American Indoor Football Association (AIFA). After two years of dormancy, the Adrenaline returned for 2011 in the IFL. The team played its home games at the Tim's Toyota Center.

History

Expansion (2008)
In October 2007, it was announced that the American Indoor Football Association (AIFA) was expanding into Prescott Valley, Arizona. After a two-week name the team contest, it was announced that the team's nickname would be the Adrenaline. In December 2007, the Adrenaline announced that Andrew Moore was named the team's head coach.

The Adrenaline opened their first ever season with a 66–21 victory over the New Mexico Wildcats. The following week the Adrenaline received their first loss in franchise history with a 69–30 loss to the Wyoming Cavalry. The Adrenaline were able to clinch a playoff berth in their first season, after a 52–27 victory of the Utah Saints. The Adrenaline finished the regular season 11–3, tying for first place in the West Division of the Western Conference. They faced the Cavalry in the Divisional Playoff game, where they were defeated 51–26.

After a successful first season, the team announced that it was suspending operations for the 2009 season due to lack of sponsorship funding.

Rebirth and fall (2011)
In October 2010, the Adrenaline announced they would be returning in the spring of 2011 as a member of the Indoor Football League (IFL).

In 2011, Nicole Joy became the first female to score a point in an IFL game.

Statistics

Season records

Coaches

Personnel

Final roster

All-league selections
 WR Quincy Jackson
 OL Dorsey Mitchell
 DL Fernandez Shaw
 DB Nick Hannah

2011 IFL season

Schedule
Key:

Standings

References

External links 
 Official website

American football teams in Arizona
Former Indoor Football League teams
Sports in Prescott Valley, Arizona
American football teams established in 2008
American football teams disestablished in 2011
2008 establishments in Arizona
2011 disestablishments in Arizona